Steven Vincent Reed (born March 11, 1965) is an American former relief pitcher in Major League Baseball.

Biography
Reed was born in Los Angeles, California and graduated from Chatsworth High School.
He played college baseball at Lewis-Clark State College, and played summer collegiate baseball for the Hazlet Elks of the Saskatchewan Major Baseball League prior to playing in the majors.

Reed was signed by the San Francisco Giants as an amateur free agent in 1988. His career stats are: 49 wins, 44 losses, 3.63 ERA, 18 saves, 630 strikeouts, and 285 BB, in 833 games (870.2 innings).

References

External links

 Baseball Almanac

1965 births
Living people
Baseball players from Los Angeles
Major League Baseball pitchers
San Francisco Giants players
Colorado Rockies players
Cleveland Indians players
Atlanta Braves players
San Diego Padres players
New York Mets players
Baltimore Orioles players
Lewis–Clark State Warriors baseball players
Pocatello Giants players
Clinton Giants players
San Jose Giants players
Phoenix Firebirds players
Shreveport Captains players
Colorado Springs Sky Sox players
Chatsworth High School alumni